"Free" a song by Californian rock band Train, released in July 1998 as the second single from their self-titled debut album. The song saw significant airplay on mainstream rock radio, later being featured on the TV show Party of Five.

Track listing
 "Free (radio exclusive remix)" 3:48
 "Free (album version)" 3:58

Charts

References

1998 songs
1998 singles
Train (band) songs